William Morley "Jopsey" Jennings (January 23, 1890 – May 13, 1985) was an American football, basketball, and baseball player, coach, and college athletics administrator.

Biography 
Jennings attended college at Mississippi State University in Starkville, at which he participated in baseball, basketball, football, and track.  Jennings served from 1912 to 1925 as the head football coach at Ouachita Baptist University in Arkadelphia, Arkansas, and then at Baylor University in Waco, Texas, from 1926 to 1940. He compiled a career college football record of 153–77–18.  He was also the head baseball coach at Baylor from 1928 to 1939, where he tallied a mark of 120–79.  From 1941 to 1951, Jennings served as the athletic director at Texas Tech University in Lubbock.  He was inducted into the College Football Hall of Fame as a coach in 1973.

Jennings was also a Major League Baseball second baseman.

Jennings and his wife, Elizabeth, had one son, Richard Autrey Jennings (1917-2019), who was born while the couple lived in Arkadelphia. In 1942, Richard Jennings obtained his Juris Doctor from George Washington Law School in Washington, D.C., where he worked on Capitol Hill for Texas U.S. Senator Tom Connally and operated an elevator in the Capitol. He subsequently practiced law in Lubbock for seventy-six years before moving to Corinth in Denton County, Texas, in his later years.

Head coaching record

Football

References

External links
 

1890 births
1985 deaths
American men's basketball players
Baylor Bears athletic directors
Baylor Bears baseball coaches
Baylor Bears football coaches
Mississippi State Bulldogs baseball players
Mississippi State Bulldogs men's basketball players
Mississippi State Bulldogs football players
Ouachita Baptist Tigers football coaches
Texas Tech Red Raiders athletic directors
College Football Hall of Fame inductees
People from Holland, Michigan
People from Arkadelphia, Arkansas
People from Waco, Texas
People from Lubbock, Texas
Major League Baseball second basemen
Washington Senators (1901–1960) players
Knoxville Reds players
Hartford Senators players
Baseball players from Michigan